Rossodus is an extinct genus of conodonts in the clade Prioniodontida, the "complex conodonts", of the Early Ordovician.

Species
Species are,
 †Rossodus manitouensis
 †Rossodus subtilis
 †Rossodus tenuis

References

External links 
 

Prioniodontida genera
Early Ordovician animals
Ordovician conodonts